Amma Aur Gulnaz is a Pakistani social drama series directed by Syed Atif Hussain and produced by Samina Humayun Saeed and Shahzad Nasir. It was first aired on May 13, 2011 on Geo Entertainment, where it airs on Tuesdays at 9:00 p.m. The drama stars Faiza Hasan, Humayun Saeed, Saleem Mairaj, Babar Khan and Hannah Sameed in lead roles.

Cast
Faiza Hasan
Humayun Saeed
Babar Khan
Beenish Chohan
Hannan Sameed
Saleem Mairaj

References

Pakistani drama television series